"Let Me Count the Ways" is a pop song performed by American boy band Natural. It was their second single released in Germany.

Background
After success with their debut single, "Put Your Arms Around Me", Lou Pearlman decided to release another teen friendly song for the European market. "Let Me Count the Ways" was chosen despite protests from the band members. Marc Terenzi has been quoted as saying "That was the beginning of the end". Indeed, the band started fighting hard for more mature releases, until they got their wish with "Paradise". Despite the protests of the members, the single was one of their highest charting, even beating "Put Your Arms Around Me" peaking at #11 in Germany.

Track listing
 "Let Me Count the Ways" (Original Mix)
 "Let Me Count the Ways" (GC's Mix)
 "Let Me Count the Ways" (Melino Mix)
 "Let Me Count the Ways" (J Cosmic Mix)
 "Let Me Count the Ways" (Instrumental)
 "Bravo Special Tour Track" (Limited Edition Bonus Track Only)

Music charts

2002 singles
Songs written by Fredrik Thomander
Songs written by Richard Supa
Songs written by Anders Wikström (songwriter)
2002 songs
Sony BMG singles